Ian Halperin (born August 17, 1964) is a Canadian investigative journalist, writer and documentary filmmaker. His 2009 book, Unmasked: The Final Years of Michael Jackson was a #1 best-seller on the New York Times list on July 24, 2009. He is the author or coauthor of nine books including Celine Dion: Behind the Fairytale, Fire and Rain: The James Taylor Story and Hollywood Undercover. He coauthored Who Killed Kurt Cobain? and Love and Death: The Murder of Kurt Cobain with Max Wallace. Halperin has contributed to 60 Minutes II and was a regular correspondent for Court TV. He is a graduate of Concordia University in Montreal (BA 07).

Michael Jackson biography
In late 2008 The Sun and In Touch Weekly cited Halperin as the source in articles stating that Michael Jackson had serious health issues. In December 2008 Halperin had predicted that Jackson had six months to live; Jackson died on June 25, 2009. At the time, the BBC reported that Halperin would release an unauthorized biography on the pop star. Halperin's statements had been denied by a Jackson representative who said in a December 2008 statement, "The writer's wild allegations concerning Mr. Jackson's health are a total fabrication...Mr. Jackson is in fine health and finalizing negotiations with a major entertainment company & television network for both a world tour and a series of specials and appearances." Shortly afterward, Jackson announced a 50-date residency at The O2 arena, holding a public press conference. Halperin released his biography on Jackson, titled Unmasked: The Final Years of Michael Jackson, in July 2009. Halperin commented on the timing of the book: "I timed it because I knew around this time he was a candidate to die. I'm being totally up-front about that. Google it."

Documentary film 
In 2010, Halperin directed and produced a documentary film about Jackson titled Gone Too Soon. It premiered on the TV Guide Network on June 25, 2010, the one-year anniversary of Jackson's death. The documentary was based on 300 hours of footage Halperin recorded before and immediately after Jackson's death.

Bibliography

 (with Max Wallace)

 (with Max Wallace)

Filmography
 2005: The Cobain Case (documentary) 
 2008: His Highness Hollywood (documentary)
 2010: Gone Too Soon (documentary)
 2012: Chasing Gaga (documentary)

References

External links
 
 
 

1964 births
Living people
Journalists from Montreal
Anglophone Quebec people
Canadian investigative journalists
Jewish Canadian journalists